Hartland is an unincorporated community in Clay County, West Virginia, United States. Its post office  is closed.

The community derives its name from J. B. Hart, an early landholder.

References 

Unincorporated communities in West Virginia
Unincorporated communities in Clay County, West Virginia